Hyposmocoma liturata is a species of moth of the family Cosmopterigidae. It was first described by Lord Walsingham in 1907. It is endemic to the Hawaiian islands of Oahu and Hawaii.

The larvae probably feed on lichen on rocks and on Pipturus. The larvae make lichen-covered cases.

External links

liturata
Endemic moths of Hawaii
Moths described in 1907
Taxa named by Thomas de Grey, 6th Baron Walsingham